Tara Jayne Andrews (born 13 March 1994) is an Australian association football player, who plays for Newcastle Jets in the Australian W-League. She has previously played for Colorado Pride in the US W-league 2nd division.

Club career

Newcastle Jets
After a season off, Andrews returned to Newcastle Jets for the 2017–18 W-League season.

References

1994 births
Living people
Australian women's soccer players
Newcastle Jets FC (A-League Women) players
A-League Women players
Women's association football forwards